The 2013–14 Torquay United F.C. season is Torquay United's 78th season in the Football League and their fifth consecutive season in League Two. The season runs from 1 July 2013 to 30 June 2014.

First team squad

End of season honours
At the end of the 2013–14 season 5 awards will be given out for, Youth Player of the Season, Youth Player of the Season, Top Goalscorer, Away Player of the Season and Player of the Season.

Youth Player of the Season - Daniel Lavercombe (GK)

Young Player of the Season – Anthony O'Connor

Top Goalscorer – Jordan Chapell

Away Player of the Season – Martin Rice

Player of the Season – Krystian Pearce

League statistics

League Two

Results summary

Results by round

Results

Friendlies

League Two

FA Cup

League Cup

League Trophy

Devon St Luke's Bowl

Club statistics

First team appearances

|-
|}
Source: Torquay United

Top scorers

Source: Torquay United

Disciplinary record

Source: Torquay United

Transfers

In

Loans in

Out

Loans out

References

2013–14 Football League Two by team
2012-13